Hazem (also spelled Hazm or Hazim) is both a given name and a surname of Arabic origin. Notable people with the name include:

Given name
Hazem El Beblawi, Egyptian economist and politician
Hazim Delić, Bosniak Deputy Commander of the Čelebići prison camp
Hazem Emam, Egyptian footballer
Hazem Harba, Syrian footballer
Hazem Salah Abu Ismail, Egyptian lawyer and politician
Hazem Mahamid, Syrian footballer
Hazem El Masri, Lebanese rugby league player
Hazem Nuseibeh, Jordanian politician
Hazim al-Shaalan, Iraqi politician
Hazim Al-Sha'arawi, Palestinian deputy director of Al-Aqsa Television

Surname
Abu Bakr ibn Muhammad ibn Hazm, Islamic scholar
Farid Hazem, French footballer
Ibn Hazm, Andalusian philosopher

See also
Hazem (UAV)

Arabic masculine given names
Bosniak masculine given names